Pedro Lopes is a retired American soccer player who coached the NJIT Highlanders men's soccer team.  He played professionally in the USISL.

Player
Lopes was raised in Newark, New Jersey and graduated from Saint Benedict's Preparatory School where he was a 1989 NSCAA High School All American soccer player.  He then attended Rutgers University, playing on the men's soccer team from 1990 to 1994, starting all 86 games during his collegiate career.  In 1990, Rutgers finished runner-up to the UCLA Bruins in the NCAA Men's Division I Soccer Championship.  He was a 1993 First Team and 1994 Second Team All American.  He was the 1994 Atlantic 10 Player of the Year.  In 2004, Rutgers inducted Lopes into the school's Athletic Hall of Fame.

In 1996 and 1997, Lopes played professionally with the North Jersey Imperials of the USISL.

Coach
Lopes began coaching as a volunteer assistant at Rutgers in 1995.  In August 1996, he became an assistant with the Centenary College men's team before returning to the Scarlet Knights as a full-time assistant coach. In 1996, Lopes joined the Jersey Knights Soccer Club, becoming the club's Director of Coaching in 2000.  In 2003, the New Jersey Institute of Technology hired Lopes as head coach of the men's soccer team.

References

External links
 NJIT: Pedro Lopes

Living people
American soccer coaches
American soccer players
NJIT Highlanders men's soccer coaches
Rutgers Scarlet Knights men's soccer coaches
Rutgers Scarlet Knights men's soccer players
North Jersey Imperials players
USISL players
Place of birth missing (living people)
Year of birth missing (living people)
Soccer players from Newark, New Jersey
All-American men's college soccer players
Association football defenders
Association football midfielders